Joseph-Ernest-Armand Sylvestre (May 15, 1890 – March 3, 1972) was a lawyer and political figure in Quebec, Canada. He represented Lake St. John from 1925 to 1930 and Lake St-John—Roberval from 1935 to 1945 in the House of Commons of Canada as a Liberal member.

He was born in Quebec City, the grandson of Louis Sylvestre. Sylvestre was first elected to the House of Commons in the 1925 federal election and reelected in 1926. He was defeated by Joseph-Léonard Duguay when he ran for reelection in 1930. Sylvestre defeated Duguay in the newly formed riding of Lake St-John—Roberval in 1935 and again in 1940.

References
 

1890 births
1972 deaths
Liberal Party of Canada MPs
Members of the House of Commons of Canada from Quebec
Politicians from Quebec City